Page + Steele, formerly known as Page and Steele, is an architecture partnership created in 1926 by Forsey Pemberton B. Page (1885–1970) and W. Harland Steele (1900–1996) in Toronto, Ontario. It is now part of the IBI Group of architectural and engineering firms.

History
Forsey Page was born in Toronto in 1885 and attended the University of Toronto where he received Bachelor of Applied Science and Master of Engineering degrees. He practiced as an architect from 1908 and served in the Canadian Army from 1916 to 1918 during World War I. He retired after 1950 and died in 1970.

Harland W. Steele was born in Stouffville, Ontario in 1900 and graduated from architecture at the University of Toronto in 1925. He retired in 1970 and died in Toronto in 1996.

In the 1950s the firm employed famed architect Peter Dickinson.

Projects
Page and Steele's projects cover the span from 1926 and 1970:

 Forest Hill Public School 1931–32
 Forest Hill North Preparatory School 1936
 Forest Hill Municipal Building 1945
 Wallberg Memorial Chemistry Building, University of Toronto 1946–1948
 Forest Hill Collegiate Institute, Toronto 1948 - Reconstruction in 1992
 Niagara Falls Collegiate and Vocational School 1948
 Page and Steele Head Office 1948-1948
 St. Joseph-Islington High School, Toronto 1950
 The high-rise portion of Regent Park, Toronto early 1950s
 Wexford Collegiate Institute, Toronto 1964
 East York Collegiate Institute, Toronto 1988 - Reconstruction

Legacy
Most of Page and Steele's projects are in Toronto, but newer ones are under construction outside Canada.
 Trinity Park Lofts, Toronto
 Four Seasons Hotel Group Head Office, Toronto
 Benevenuto Place, Toronto
 O'Keefe Centre, Toronto
 Beth Tzedec Synagogue, Toronto
 Delta Hotel Toronto
 Air Canada Centre Expansion
 Colossus Vaughan
 Maple Leaf Square
 Empress Walk
 Shore Club, Jersey City NJ
 J.W. Marriott and Resort Hotel, Aqaba, Jordan
 Four Seasons Hotel Amman
 Four Seasons Hotel Prague
 Atrium on Bay
 Denison Armoury 1961, demolished 2003

References

External links
 Page + Steele / IBI Group Architects

Architecture firms of Canada
Design companies established in 1926
Companies based in Toronto
1926 establishments in Ontario
University of Toronto alumni